The 45th United States Congress was a meeting of the legislative branch of the United States federal government, consisting of the United States Senate and the United States House of Representatives. It met in Washington, D.C. from March 4, 1877, to March 4, 1879, during the first two years of Rutherford Hayes's presidency. The apportionment of seats in the House of Representatives was based on the 1870 United States census. The Senate had a Republican majority, and the House had a Democratic majority.

The 45th Congress remained politically divided between a Democratic House and Republican Senate. President Hayes vetoed an Army appropriations bill from the House which would have ended Reconstruction and prohibited the use of federal troops to protect polling stations in the former Confederacy. Striking back, Congress overrode another of Hayes’s vetoes and enacted the Bland-Allison Act that required the purchase and coining of silver. Congress also approved a generous increase in pension eligibility for Northern Civil War veterans.

Major events 

 March 4, 1877: Rutherford B. Hayes became President of the United States

Major legislation 

 February 28, 1878: Bland–Allison Act (Coinage Act (Silver Dollar)), Sess. 2, ch. 20, 
 April 29, 1878: National Quarantine Act of 1878, Sess. 2, ch. 66, 
 June 3, 1878: Timber and Stone Act, Sess. 2, ch. 151, 
 June 18, 1878: Posse Comitatus Act, Sess. 2, ch. 263, §15,

Party summary 

The count below identifies party affiliations at the beginning of the first session of this Congress, and includes members from vacancies and newly admitted states, when they were first seated. Changes resulting from subsequent replacements are shown below in the "Changes in membership" section.

During this Congress, two Senate seats and one House seat were added for the new state, Colorado.

Senate

House of Representatives

Leadership

Senate 
 President: William A. Wheeler (R)
 President pro tempore: Thomas W. Ferry (R)
 Republican Conference Chairman: Henry B. Anthony
 Democratic Caucus Chairman: William A. Wallace

House of Representatives 
 Speaker: Samuel J. Randall (D)
 Democratic Caucus Chairman: Hiester Clymer
 Republican Conference Chairman: Eugene Hale
 Democratic Campaign Committee Chairman: Joseph Clay Stiles Blackburn

Members 
This list is arranged by chamber, then by state. Senators are listed in order of seniority, and representatives are listed by district.

Senate 
Senators were elected by the state legislatures every two years, with one-third beginning new six-year terms with each Congress. Preceding the names in the list below are Senate class numbers, which indicate the cycle of their election. In this Congress, Class 1 meant their term began in the last Congress, requiring reelection in 1880; Class 2 meant their term began in this Congress, requiring reelection in 1882; and Class 3 meant their term ended in this Congress, requiring reelection in 1878.
Skip to House of Representatives, below

Alabama 
 2. John T. Morgan (D)
 3. George E. Spencer (R)

Arkansas 
 2. Augustus H. Garland (D)
 3. Stephen W. Dorsey (R)

California 
 1. Newton Booth (AM)
 3. Aaron A. Sargent (R)

Colorado 
 2. Henry M. Teller (R)
 3. Jerome B. Chaffee (R)

Connecticut 
 1. William W. Eaton (D)
 3. William H. Barnum (D)

Delaware 
 1. Thomas F. Bayard Sr. (D)
 2. Eli M. Saulsbury (D)

Florida 
 1. Charles W. Jones (D)
 3. Simon B. Conover (R)

Georgia 
 2. Benjamin H. Hill (D)
 3. John B. Gordon (D)

Illinois 
 2. David Davis (I)
 3. Richard J. Oglesby (R)

Indiana 
 1. Joseph E. McDonald (D)
 3. Oliver H. P. T. Morton (R), until November 1, 1877
 Daniel W. Voorhees (D), from November 6, 1877

Iowa 
 2. Samuel J. Kirkwood (R)
 3. William B. Allison (R)

Kansas 
 2. Preston B. Plumb (R)
 3. John J. Ingalls (R)

Kentucky 
 2. James B. Beck (D)
 3. Thomas C. McCreery (D)

Louisiana 
 2. William Pitt Kellogg (R)
 3. James B. Eustis (D)

Maine 
 1. Hannibal Hamlin (R)
 2. James G. Blaine (R)

Maryland 
 1. William Pinkney Whyte (D)
 3. George R. Dennis (D)

Massachusetts 
 1. Henry L. Dawes (R)
 2. George F. Hoar (R)

Michigan 
 1. Isaac P. Christiancy (R), until February 10, 1879
 Zachariah Chandler (R), from February 22, 1879
 2. Thomas W. Ferry (R)

Minnesota 
 1. Samuel J. R. McMillan (R)
 2. William Windom (R)

Mississippi 
 1. Blanche Bruce (R)
 2. Lucius Q. C. Lamar (D)

Missouri 
 1. Francis Cockrell (D)
 3. Lewis V. Bogy (D), until September 20, 1877
 David H. Armstrong (D), September 29, 1877 - January 26, 1879
 James Shields (D), from January 27, 1879

Nebraska 
 1. Algernon Paddock (R)
 2. Alvin Saunders (R)

Nevada 
 1. William Sharon (R)
 3. John P. Jones (R)

New Hampshire 
 2. Edward H. Rollins (R)
 3. Bainbridge Wadleigh (R)

New Jersey 
 1. Theodore F. Randolph (D)
 2. John R. McPherson (D)

New York 
 1. Francis Kernan (D)
 3. Roscoe Conkling (R)

North Carolina 
 2. Matt W. Ransom (D)
 3. Augustus S. Merrimon (D)

Ohio 
 1. Allen G. Thurman (D)
 3. John Sherman (R), until March 8, 1877
 Stanley Matthews (R), from March 21, 1877

Oregon 
 2. La Fayette Grover (D)
 3. John H. Mitchell (R)

Pennsylvania 
 1. William A. Wallace (D)
 3. Simon Cameron (R), until March 12, 1877
 J. Donald Cameron (R), from March 20, 1877

Rhode Island 
 1. Ambrose Burnside (R)
 2. Henry B. Anthony (R)

South Carolina 
 2. Matthew Butler (D)
 3. John J. Patterson (R)

Tennessee 
 1. James E. Bailey (D)
 2. Isham G. Harris (D)

Texas 
 1. Samuel B. Maxey (D)
 2. Richard Coke (D)

Vermont 
 1. George F. Edmunds (R)
 3. Justin S. Morrill (R)

Virginia 
 1. Robert E. Withers (D)
 2. John W. Johnston (D)

West Virginia 
 1. Frank Hereford (D)
 2. Henry G. Davis (D)

Wisconsin 
 1. Angus Cameron (R)
 3. Timothy O. Howe (R)

House of Representatives 
The names of members of the House of Representatives are preceded by their district numbers.

Alabama 
 . James T. Jones (D)
 . Hilary A. Herbert (D)
 . Jeremiah N. Williams (D)
 . Charles M. Shelley (D)
 . Robert F. Ligon (D)
 . Goldsmith W. Hewitt (D)
 . William H. Forney (D)
 . William W. Garth (D)

Arkansas 
 . Lucien C. Gause (D)
 . William F. Slemons (D)
 . Jordan E. Cravens (ID)
 . Thomas M. Gunter (D)

California 
 . Horace Davis (R)
 . Horace F. Page (R)
 . John K. Luttrell (D)
 . Romualdo Pacheco (R), until February 7, 1878
 Peter D. Wigginton (D), from February 7, 1878

Colorado 
 . James B. Belford (R), until December 13, 1877
 Thomas M. Patterson (D), from December 13, 1877

Connecticut 
 . George M. Landers (D)
 . James Phelps (D)
 . John T. Wait (R)
 . Levi Warner (D)

Delaware 
 . James Williams (D)

Florida 
 . Robert H. M. Davidson (D)
 . Horatio Bisbee Jr. (R), until February 20, 1879
 Jesse J. Finley (D), from February 20, 1879

Georgia 
 . Julian Hartridge (D), until January 8, 1879
 William B. Fleming (D), from February 10, 1879
 . William E. Smith (D)
 . Philip Cook (D)
 . Henry R. Harris (D)
 . Milton A. Candler (D)
 . James H. Blount (D)
 . William H. Felton (ID)
 . Alexander H. Stephens (D)
 . Hiram P. Bell (D), from March 13, 1877

Illinois 
 . William Aldrich (R)
 . Carter H. Harrison (D)
 . Lorenzo Brentano (R)
 . William Lathrop (R)
 . Horatio C. Burchard (R)
 . Thomas J. Henderson (R)
 . Philip C. Hayes (R)
 . Greenbury L. Fort (R)
 . Thomas A. Boyd (R)
 . Benjamin F. Marsh (R)
 . Robert M. Knapp (D)
 . William M. Springer (D)
 . Thomas F. Tipton (R)
 . Joseph G. Cannon (R)
 . John R. Eden (D)
 . William A. J. Sparks (D)
 . William R. Morrison (D)
 . William Hartzell (D)
 . Richard W. Townshend (D)

Indiana 
 . Benoni S. Fuller (D)
 . Thomas R. Cobb (D)
 . George A. Bicknell (D)
 . Leonidas Sexton (R)
 . Thomas M. Browne (R)
 . Milton S. Robinson (R)
 . John Hanna (R)
 . Morton C. Hunter (R)
 . Michael D. White (R)
 . William H. Calkins (R)
 . James L. Evans (R)
 . Andrew H. Hamilton (D)
 . John Baker (R)

Iowa 
 . Joseph C. Stone (R)
 . Hiram Price (R)
 . Theodore W. Burdick (R)
 . Nathaniel C. Deering (R)
 . Rush Clark (R)
 . Ezekiel S. Sampson (R)
 . Henry J. B. Cummings (R)
 . William F. Sapp (R)
 . S. Addison Oliver (R)

Kansas 
 . William A. Phillips (R)
 . Dudley C. Haskell (R)
 . Thomas Ryan (R)

Kentucky 
 . Andrew Boone (D)
 . James A. McKenzie (D)
 . John William Caldwell (D)
 . J. Proctor Knott (D)
 . Albert S. Willis (D)
 . John G. Carlisle (D)
 . Joseph C. S. Blackburn (D)
 . Milton J. Durham (D)
 . Thomas Turner (D)
 . John B. Clarke (D)

Louisiana 
 . Randall L. Gibson (D)
 . E. John Ellis (D)
 . Chester B. Darrall (R), until February 20, 1878
 Joseph H. Acklen (D), from February 20, 1878
 . Joseph B. Elam (D)
 . John E. Leonard (R), until March 15, 1878
 John S. Young (D), from November 5, 1878
 . Edward W. Robertson (D)

Maine 
 . Thomas B. Reed (R)
 . William P. Frye (R)
 . Stephen D. Lindsey (R)
 . Llewellyn Powers (R)
 . Eugene Hale (R)

Maryland 
 . Daniel M. Henry (D)
 . Charles B. Roberts (D)
 . William Kimmel (D)
 . Thomas Swann (D)
 . Eli J. Henkle (D)
 . William Walsh (D)

Massachusetts 
 . William W. Crapo (R)
 . Benjamin W. Harris (R)
 . Walbridge A. Field (R), until March 28, 1878
 Benjamin Dean (D), from March 28, 1878
 . Leopold Morse (D)
 . Nathaniel P. Banks (R)
 . George B. Loring (R)
 . Benjamin F. Butler (R)
 . William Claflin (R)
 . William W. Rice (R)
 . Amasa Norcross (R)
 . George D. Robinson (R)

Michigan 
 . Alpheus S. Williams (D), until December 21, 1878
 . Edwin Willits (R)
 . Jonas H. McGowan (R)
 . Edwin W. Keightley (R)
 . John W. Stone (R)
 . Mark S. Brewer (R)
 . Omar D. Conger (R)
 . Charles C. Ellsworth (R)
 . Jay A. Hubbell (R)

Minnesota 
 . Mark H. Dunnell (R)
 . Horace B. Strait (R)
 . Jacob H. Stewart (R)

Mississippi 
 . Henry L. Muldrow (D)
 . Vannoy H. Manning (D)
 . Hernando Money (D)
 . Otho R. Singleton (D)
 . Charles E. Hooker (D)
 . James R. Chalmers (D)

Missouri 
 . Anthony F. Ittner (R)
 . Nathan Cole (R)
 . Lyne S. Metcalfe (R)
 . Robert A. Hatcher (D)
 . Richard P. Bland (D)
 . Charles H. Morgan (D)
 . Thomas T. Crittenden (D)
 . Benjamin J. Franklin (D)
 . David Rea (D)
 . Henry M. Pollard (R)
 . John B. Clark Jr. (D)
 . John M. Glover (D)
 . Aylett H. Buckner (D)

Nebraska 
 . Frank Welch (R), until September 4, 1878
 Thomas J. Majors (R), from November 5, 1878

Nevada 
 . Thomas Wren (R)

New Hampshire 
 . Frank Jones (D)
 . James F. Briggs (R)
 . Henry W. Blair (R)

New Jersey 
 . Clement H. Sinnickson (R)
 . John H. Pugh (R)
 . Miles Ross (D)
 . Alvah A. Clark (D)
 . Augustus W. Cutler (D)
 . Thomas B. Peddie (R)
 . Augustus A. Hardenbergh (D)

New York 
 . James W. Covert (D)
 . William D. Veeder (D)
 . Simeon B. Chittenden (R)
 . Archibald M. Bliss (D)
 . Nicholas Muller (D)
 . Samuel S. Cox (D)
 . Anthony Eickhoff (D)
 . Anson G. McCook (R)
 . Fernando Wood (D)
 . Abram S. Hewitt (D)
 . Benjamin A. Willis (D)
 . Clarkson N. Potter (D)
 . John H. Ketcham (R)
 . George M. Beebe (D)
 . Stephen L. Mayham (D)
 . Terence J. Quinn (D), until June 18, 1878
 John M. Bailey (R), from November 5, 1878
 . Martin I. Townsend (R)
 . Andrew Williams (R)
 . Amaziah B. James (R)
 . John H. Starin (R)
 . Solomon Bundy (R)
 . George A. Bagley (R)
 . William J. Bacon (R)
 . William H. Baker (R)
 . Frank Hiscock (R)
 . John H. Camp (R)
 . Elbridge G. Lapham (R)
 . Jeremiah W. Dwight (R)
 . John N. Hungerford (R)
 . E. Kirke Hart (D)
 . Charles B. Benedict (D)
 . Daniel N. Lockwood (D)
 . George W. Patterson (R)

North Carolina 
 . Jesse J. Yeates (D)
 . Curtis H. Brogden (R)
 . Alfred M. Waddell (D)
 . Joseph J. Davis (D)
 . Alfred M. Scales (D)
 . Walter L. Steele (D)
 . William M. Robbins (D)
 . Robert B. Vance (D)

Ohio 
 . Milton Sayler (D)
 . Henry B. Banning (D)
 . Mills Gardner (R)
 . John A. McMahon (D)
 . Americus V. Rice (D)
 . Jacob D. Cox (R)
 . Henry L. Dickey (D)
 . J. Warren Keifer (R)
 . John S. Jones (R)
 . Charles Foster (R)
 . Henry S. Neal (R)
 . Thomas Ewing Jr. (D)
 . Milton I. Southard (D)
 . Ebenezer B. Finley (D)
 . Nelson H. Van Vorhes (R)
 . Lorenzo Danford (R)
 . William McKinley (R)
 . James Monroe (R)
 . James A. Garfield (R)
 . Amos Townsend (R)

Oregon 
 . Richard Williams (R)

Pennsylvania 
 . Chapman Freeman (R)
 . Charles O'Neill (R)
 . Samuel J. Randall (D)
 . William D. Kelley (R)
 . Alfred C. Harmer (R)
 . William Ward (R)
 . I. Newton Evans (R)
 . Hiester Clymer (D)
 . A. Herr Smith (R)
 . Samuel A. Bridges (D)
 . Francis D. Collins (D)
 . Hendrick B. Wright (D)
 . James B. Reilly (D)
 . John W. Killinger (R)
 . Edward Overton Jr. (R)
 . John I. Mitchell (R)
 . Jacob M. Campbell (R)
 . William Stenger (D)
 . Levi Maish (D)
 . Levi A. Mackey (D)
 . Jacob Turney (D)
 . Russell Errett (R)
 . Thomas M. Bayne (R)
 . William S. Shallenberger (R)
 . Harry White (R)
 . John M. Thompson (R)
 . Lewis F. Watson (R)

Rhode Island 
 . Benjamin T. Eames (R)
 . Latimer W. Ballou (R)

South Carolina 
 . Joseph Rainey (R)
 . Richard H. Cain (R)
 . D. Wyatt Aiken (D)
 . John H. Evins (D)
 . Robert Smalls (R)

Tennessee 
 . James H. Randolph (R)
 . Jacob M. Thornburgh (R)
 . George G. Dibrell (D)
 . Haywood Y. Riddle (D)
 . John M. Bright (D)
 . John F. House (D)
 . Washington C. Whitthorne (D)
 . John D. C. Atkins (D)
 . William P. Caldwell (D)
 . H. Casey Young (D)

Texas 
 . John H. Reagan (D)
 . David B. Culberson (D)
 . James W. Throckmorton (D)
 . Roger Q. Mills (D)
 . Dewitt C. Giddings (D)
 . Gustave Schleicher (D), until January 10, 1879

Vermont 
 . Charles H. Joyce (R)
 . Dudley C. Denison (R)
 . George W. Hendee (R)

Virginia 
 . Beverly B. Douglas (D), until December 22, 1878
 Richard Lee T. Beale (D), from January 23, 1879
 . John Goode Jr. (D)
 . Gilbert C. Walker (D)
 . Joseph Jorgensen (R)
 . George Cabell (D)
 . John R. Tucker (D)
 . John T. Harris (D)
 . Eppa Hutton, II (D)
 . Auburn Pridemore (D)

West Virginia 
 . Benjamin Wilson (D)
 . Benjamin F. Martin (D)
 . John E. Kenna (D)

Wisconsin 
 . Charles G. Williams (R)
 . Lucien B. Caswell (R)
 . George C. Hazelton (R)
 . William P. Lynde (D)
 . Edward S. Bragg (D)
 . Gabriel Bouck (D)
 . Herman L. Humphrey (R)
 . Thaddeus C. Pound (R)

Non-voting members 
 . Hiram S. Stevens (D)
 . Jefferson P. Kidder (R)
 . Stephen S. Fenn (D)
 . Martin Maginnis (D)
 . Trinidad Romero (R)
 . George Q. Cannon (R)
 . Orange Jacobs (R)
 . William W. Corlett (R)

Changes in membership 
The count below reflects changes from the beginning of the first session of this Congress.

Senate 
 Replacements: 5
 Democratic: 1 seat net gain
 Republican: 1 seat net loss
 Deaths: 2
 Resignations: 3
 Interim appointments: 1
 Contested elections: 0
 Total seats with changes: 5

|-
| Ohio (3)
| nowrap  | John Sherman (R)
| Resigned March 8, 1877 to become U.S. Secretary of the Treasury.Successor elected March 21, 1877.
| nowrap  | Stanley Matthews (R)
| March 21, 1877

|-
| Pennsylvania (3)
| nowrap  | Simon Cameron (R)
| Resigned March 12, 1877.Successor elected March 20, 1877.
| nowrap  | J. Donald Cameron (R)
| March 20, 1877

|-
| Missouri (3)
| nowrap  | Lewis V. Bogy (D)
| Died September 20, 1877.Successor was appointed September 29, 1877, to continue the term.
| nowrap  | David H. Armstrong (D)
| September 29, 1877

|-
| Indiana (3)
| nowrap  | Oliver P. Morton (R)
| Died November 1, 1877.Successor elected January 31, 1879.
| nowrap  | Daniel W. Voorhees (D)
| November 6, 1877

|-
| Missouri (3)
| nowrap  | David H. Armstrong (D)
| Interim appointee retired.Successor elected January 26, 1879.
| nowrap  | James Shields (D)
| January 27, 1879

|-
| Michigan (1)
| nowrap  | Isaac P. Christiancy (R)
| Resigned February 10, 1879 due to ill health.Successor elected February 22, 1879.
| nowrap  | Zachariah Chandler (R)
| February 22, 1879

|}

House of Representatives 
 Replacements: 10
 Democratic: 5 seat net gain
 Republican: 5 seat net loss
 Deaths: 7
 Resignations: 1
 Contested election: 5
 Total seats with changes: 13

|-
| 
| Vacant
| Rep. Benjamin Harvey Hill resigned in previous congress
| nowrap  | Hiram P. Bell (D)
| March 13, 1877
|-
| 
| nowrap  | James B. Belford (R)
| Lost contested election December 13, 1877
| nowrap  | Thomas M. Patterson (D)
| December 13, 1877
|-
| 
| nowrap  | Romualdo Pacheco (R)
| Lost contested election February 7, 1878
| nowrap  | Peter D. Wigginton (D)
| February 7, 1878
|-
| 
| nowrap  | Chester B. Darrall (R)
| Lost contested election February 20, 1878
| nowrap  | Joseph H. Acklen (D)
| February 20, 1878
|-
| 
| nowrap  | John E. Leonard (R)
| Died March 15, 1878
| nowrap  | J. Smith Young (D)
| November 5, 1878
|-
| 
| nowrap  | Walbridge A. Field (R)
| Lost contested election March 28, 1878
| nowrap  | Benjamin Dean (D)
| March 28, 1878
|-
| 
| nowrap  | Terence J. Quinn (D)
| Died June 18, 1878
| nowrap  | John M. Bailey (R)
| November 5, 1878
|-
| 
| nowrap  | Frank Welch (R)
| style="font-size:80%" |Died September 4, 1878
| nowrap  | Thomas J. Majors (R)
| November 5, 1878
|-
| 
| nowrap  | Alpheus S. Williams (D)
| Died December 21, 1878
| Vacant
| Not filled this term
|-
| 
| nowrap  | Beverly B. Douglas (D)
| Died December 22, 1878
| nowrap  | Richard L. T. Beale (D)
| January 23, 1879
|-
| 
| nowrap  | Julian Hartridge (D)
| Died January 8, 1879
| nowrap  | William B. Fleming (D)
| February 10, 1879
|-
| 
| nowrap  | Gustav Schleicher (D)
| Died January 10, 1879
| Vacant
| Not filled this term
|-
| 
| nowrap  | Horatio Bisbee Jr. (R)
| Lost contested election February 20, 1879
| nowrap  | Jesse J. Finley (D)
| February 20, 1879
|}

Committees

Senate 

 Agriculture (Chairman: Algernon S. Paddock; Ranking Member: Henry G. Davis)
 Appropriations (Chairman: William Windom; Ranking Member: Henry G. Davis)
 Audit and Control the Contingent Expenses of the Senate (Chairman: John P. Jones; Ranking Member: George R. Dennis)
 Civil Service and Retrenchment (Chairman: Henry M. Teller; Ranking Member: Thomas C. McCreery)
 Claims (Chairman: Samuel J. R. McMillan; Ranking Member: Francis M. Cockrell)
 Commerce (Chairman: Roscoe Conkling; Ranking Member: John B. Gordon)
 Distributing Public Revenue Among the States (Select)
 District of Columbia (Chairman: Stephen W. Dorsey; Ranking Member: Augustus S. Merrimon)
 Education and Labor (Chairman: Ambrose E. Burnside; Ranking Member: John B. Gordon)
 Elections of 1878 (Select)
 Engrossed Bills (Chairman: Thomas F. Bayard; Ranking Member: Henry B. Anthony)
 Epidemic Diseases (Select)
 Examine the Several Branches in the Civil Service (Select) (Chairman: Jerome B. Chaffee; Ranking Member: Augustus S. Merrimon)
 Finance (Chairman: Justin S. Morrill; Ranking Member: Thomas F. Bayard)
 Foreign Relations (Chairman: Hannibal Hamlin; Ranking Member: Thomas C. McCreery)
 Hot Springs (Arkansas) Commission (Special)
 Indian Affairs (Chairman: William B. Allison; Ranking Member: Thomas C. McCreery)
 Judiciary (Chairman: George F. Edmunds; Ranking Member: David Davis)
 Late Presidential Election Louisiana
 Manufactures (Chairman: Edward H. Rollins; Ranking Member: John W. Johnston)
 Mexican Relations (Select)
 Military Affairs (Chairman: George E. Spencer; Ranking Member: Theodore F. Randolph)
 Mines and Mining (Chairman: William Sharon; Ranking Member: Frank Hereford)
 Mississippi River Levee System (Select) (Chairman: Blanche Bruce; Ranking Member: Francis M. Cockrell)
 Naval Affairs (Chairman: Aaron A. Sargent; Ranking Member: William P. Whyte)
 Ordnance and War Ships (Select)
 Patents (Chairman: Newton Booth; Ranking Member: Francis Kernan)
 Pensions (Chairman: John J. Ingalls; Ranking Member: Robert E. Withers)
 Post Office and Post Roads (Chairman: Thomas W. Ferry; Ranking Member: Ambrose E. Burnside)
 Private Land Claims (Chairman: Allen G. Thurman; Ranking Member: Isaac P. Christiancy)
 Privileges and Elections (Chairman: Bainbridge Wadleigh; Ranking Member: John J. Ingalls)
 Public Lands (Chairman: Richard J. Oglesby; Ranking Member: Joseph E. McDonald)
 Railroads (Chairman: John H. Mitchell; Ranking Member: Stanley Matthews)
 Revision of the Laws (Chairman: Isaac P. Christiancy; Ranking Member: William A. Wallace)
 Revolutionary Claims (Chairman: John W. Johnston; Ranking Member: Henry L. Dawes)
 Rules (Chairman: James G. Blaine; Ranking Member: Augustus S. Merrimon)
 Tariff Regulation (Select)
 Tenth Census (Select) (Chairman: Justin S. Morrill; Ranking Member: N/A)
 Territories (Chairman: John J. Patterson; Ranking Member: Augustus H. Garland)
 Transportation Routes to the Seaboard (Select) (Chairman: Angus Cameron; Ranking Member: N/A)
 Treasury Department Account Discrepancies (Select) (Chairman: Henry G. Davis; Ranking Member: John J. Ingalls)
 Whole

House of Representatives 

 Accounts (Chairman: Charles B. Roberts; Ranking Member: Henry W. Blair)
 Agriculture (Chairman: Augustus W. Cutler; Ranking Member: Walter L. Steele)
 Appropriations (Chairman: John DeWitt Clinton Atkins; Ranking Member: Milton J. Durham)
 Banking and Currency (Chairman: Aylett H. Buckner; Ranking Member: Elizur K. Hart)
 Claims (Chairman: John M. Bright; Ranking Member: Daniel N. Lockwood)
 Coinage, Weights and Measures (Chairman: Alexander H. Stephens; Ranking Member: John B. Clarke)
 Commerce (Chairman: John H. Reagan; Ranking Member: John E. Kenna)
 District of Columbia (Chairman: Alpheus S. Williams then Joseph C.S. Blackburn; Ranking Member: Gabriel Bouck)
 Education and Labor (Chairman: John Goode; Ranking Member: Van H. Manning)
 Elections (Chairman: John T. Harris; Ranking Member: E. John Ellis)
 Enrolled Bills (Chairman: Andrew H. Hamilton; Ranking Member: Nelson H. Van Vorhes)
 Expenditures in the Interior Department (Chairman: William A.J. Sparks; Ranking Member: Edwin Willits)
 Expenditures in the Justice Department (Chairman: Edward S. Bragg; Ranking Member: Nicholas Muller)
 Expenditures in the Navy Department (Chairman: Benjamin A. Willis; Ranking Member: Jay A. Hubbell)
 Expenditures in the Post Office Department (Chairman: Jeremiah N. Williams; Ranking Member: Curtis H. Brogden)
 Expenditures in the State Department (Chairman: William M. Springer; Ranking Member: Thomas M. Bayne)
 Expenditures in the Treasury Department (Chairman: John M. Glover; Ranking Member: Henry L. Dickey)
 Expenditures in the War Department (Chairman: Joseph C. S. Blackburn; Ranking Member: Benjamin T. Eames)
 Expenditures on Public Buildings (Chairman: William P. Lynde; Ranking Member: William S. Stenger)
 Foreign Affairs (Chairman: Thomas Swann; Ranking Member: Benjamin Wilson)
 Indian Affairs (Chairman: Alfred M. Scales; Ranking Member: George M. Beebe)
 Invalid Pensions (Chairman: Americus V. Rice; Ranking Member: Clement H. Sinnickson)
 Judiciary (Chairman: J. Proctor Knott; Ranking Member: David B. Culberson)
 Levees and Improvements of the Mississippi River
 Manufactures (Chairman: Hendrick B. Wright; Ranking Member: Robert F. Ligon)
 Mileage (Chairman: Thomas R. Cobb; Ranking Member: Lorenzo Danford)
 Military Affairs (Chairman: Henry B. Banning; Ranking Member: Edward S. Bragg)
 Militia (Chairman: Miles Ross; Ranking Member: Thomas Turner)
 Mines and Mining (Chairman: George M. Beebe; Ranking Member: James T. Jones)
 Mississippi Levees (Chairman: Edward W. Robertson; Ranking Member: Benjamin F. Martin)
 Naval Affairs (Chairman: Washington C. Whitthorne; Ranking Member: Benjamin W. Harris)
 Pacific Railroads (Chairman: James W. Throckmorton; Ranking Member: Charles O'Neill)
 Patents (Chairman: Robert B. Vance; Ranking Member: Augustus W. Cutler)
 Post Office and Post Roads (Chairman: Alfred M. Waddell; Ranking Member: Terence J. Quinn then Joseph G. Cannon)
 Private Land Claims (Chairman: Thomas M. Gunter; Ranking Member: Dudley C. Denison)
 Public Buildings and Grounds (Chairman: Philip Cook; Ranking Member: James A. McKenzie)
 Public Expenditures (Chairman: Robert A. Hatcher; Ranking Member: Robert H.M. Davidson)
 Public Lands (Chairman: William R. Morrison; Ranking Member: William E. Smith)
 Railways and Canals (Chairman: George C. Cabell; Ranking Member: Alvah A. Clark)
 Revision of Laws (Chairman: William Walsh; Ranking Member: Walbridge A. Field)
 Rules (Select) (Chairman: Samuel J. Randall; Ranking Member: Nathaniel P. Banks)
 Revolutionary Pensions (Chairman: Levi A. Mackey; Ranking Member: William Kimmel)
 Standards of Official Conduct
 Territories (Chairman: Benjamin J. Franklin; Ranking Member: George A. Bagley)
 War Claims (Chairman: John R. Eden; Ranking Member: S. Addison Oliver)
 Ways and Means (Chairman: Fernando Wood; Ranking Member: James Phelps)
 Whole

Joint committees 

 Conditions of Indian Tribes (Special)
 Enrolled Bills (Chairman: Rep. Andrew H. Hamilton; Vice Chairman: Rep. Nelson H. Van Vorhes)
 The Library (Chairman: Rep. Samuel S. Cox; Vice Chairman: Rep. Eugene Hale)
 Printing (Chairman: Rep. Otho R. Singleton; Vice Chairman: Rep. Latimer W. Ballou)
 Reorganization of the Army
 Transfer of the Indian Bureau

Caucuses 
 Democratic (House)
 Democratic (Senate)

Employees

Legislative branch agency directors 
 Architect of the Capitol: Edward Clark
 Librarian of Congress: Ainsworth Rand Spofford
 Public Printer of the United States: John D. Defrees

Senate 
 Chaplain: Byron Sunderland (Presbyterian)
 Librarian: George F. Dawson
 Secretary: George C. Gorham
 Sergeant at Arms: John R. French

House of Representatives 
 Chaplain: I.L. Townsend (Episcopalian), until October 15, 1877
 John Poise (Methodist), until December 3, 1877
 W. P. Harrison (Methodist), elected December 3, 1877
 Clerk: George M. Adams
 Clerk at the Speaker’s Table: William H. Scudder
 J. Randolph Tucker Jr.
 Doorkeeper: John W. Polk, elected October 17, 1877
 Charles W. Field, elected April 8, 1878
 Postmaster: James M. Steuart
 Reading Clerks: Thomas S. Pettit (D) and Neill S. Brown Jr. (R)
 Sergeant at Arms: John G. Thompson

See also 
 1876 United States elections (elections leading to this Congress)
 1876 United States presidential election
 1876–77 United States Senate elections
 1876–77 United States House of Representatives elections
 1878 United States elections (elections during this Congress, leading to the next Congress)
 1878–79 United States Senate elections
 1878–79 United States House of Representatives elections

Notes

References

External links 
 Biographical Directory of the U.S. Congress
 U.S. House of Representatives: House History
 U.S. Senate: Statistics and Lists